Yusupha Yaffa is a Gambian footballer who plays as a forward.

Career

As a youth player, Yaffa joined the youth academy of Italian Serie A side Milan. Before the second half of 2014–15, Yaffa joined the youth academy of Eintracht Frankfurt in the German Bundesliga. In 2015, he signed for German fifth tier club MSV Duisburg II.

Before the second half of 2021–22, Yaffa signed for Tsarsko Selo in the Bulgarian top flight after trialing for Polish team Korona Kielce. On 25 February 2022, he debuted for Tsarsko Selo during a 0–1 loss to Lokomotiv (Plovdiv). On 21 May 2022, in the last match of the season, Tsarsko selo got a penalty that could bring them the win and save the team from relegation. Yaffa decided to take the penalty despite Martin Kavdanski being the regular penalty taker. Yaffa was ready to take the penalty when the owner of the team, Stoyne Manolov, entered the pitch and fought with him. He left the pitch and Kavdanski took the penalty, but missed and the team was relegated.

References

External links
 

Association football forwards
Expatriate footballers in Bulgaria
Expatriate footballers in Germany
FC Tsarsko Selo Sofia players
First Professional Football League (Bulgaria) players
Gambian expatriate footballers
Gambian expatriate sportspeople in Bulgaria
Gambian expatriate sportspeople in Germany
Gambian footballers
Living people
MSV Duisburg II players
Oberliga (football) players
People from Serekunda
1996 births